Wieder geil! is the fourth album by German metalcore band We Butter the Bread with Butter, released in May 2015.

Track listing

Credits 
Writing, performance and production credits are adapted from the album liner notes.

Personnel

We Butter the Bread with Butter 
 Paul "Борщ" Bartzsch – vocals
 Marcel Neumann – guitar, keyboard, programming
 Maximilian Saux – bass
 Can Özgünsür – drums

Additional musicians 
 Daniel Haniß – synthesizer

Production 
 Marcel Neumann – production, recording
 Daniel Haniß – mixing, FX production
 Aljoscha Sieg – stem mixing and mastering

Artwork and design 
 Paul Bartzsch – artwork
 Martin E. Landsmann – photography

Studios 
 Karma Recordings – mixing

Charts

References

External links 
 
 Wieder Geil! at AFM

2015 albums
German-language albums
We Butter the Bread with Butter albums